Anne Marie Timoléon François de Cossé Brissac, 11th Duke of Brissac (1868–1944), was a French aristocrat and author. He held the French noble title of Duke of Brissac from 1883 to 1944.

Early life and career
He was born on 12 February 1868 in Paris, France. His maternal grandfather, Louis Say, was the founder of the Say sugar empire (now known as Béghin-Say, a subsidiary of Tereos). His maternal granduncle, Jean-Baptiste Say, was a classical liberal economist.

He graduated from the École spéciale militaire de Saint-Cyr, a military academy in Brittany, France. He wrote a historical book about the Austrian court, titled Un Carrousel à la cour d'Autriche. In 1894, he wrote a second book, based on his memories about the army.

Marriage and later life
He married Mathilde Renée de Crussol d'Uzès (1875-1908), the daughter of the 12th Duke of Uzès and Anne de Rochechouart de Mortemart, on 4 November 1894. They resided at the Château de Brissac in Brissac-Quincé, Maine-et-Loire, France.

He died in 1944. He was succeeded as Duke of Brissac by his son, Pierre de Cossé Brissac.

Bibliography
Un Carrousel à la cour d'Autriche. (Nancy: imprimerie de Berger-Levrault).
Leçons de chic. Souvenirs et traditions militaires, par une sabretache (1894, Paris: imprimerie de Berger-Levrault).

References

1868 births
1944 deaths
People from Maine-et-Loire
Francois
French male writers